The National Cybersecurity Alliance (NCA), is a 501(c)(3) USA non-profit organization founded in 2001, promoting cyber security, privacy, education, and awareness. The NCA works with various stakeholders in the government, industry and civil society. The NCA promotes partnerships between the federal government and corporations operating in technology. NCA's primary federal partner is the Cyber security and Infrastructure Security Agency within the U.S. Department of Homeland Security.

NCA's core efforts include Cybersecurity Awareness Month (October); Data Privacy Day (Jan. 28); and Cyber Secure Business. 

Cybersecurity Awareness Month was launched by the NCA and the U.S. Department of Homeland Security (DHS) in October 2004 to raise public knowledge of best cyber practices among Americans. When Cybersecurity Awareness Month first began, the focus was on simple precautions such as keeping antivirus software up to date. The month has expanded in reach and involvement. Operated in many respects as a grassroots campaign, the month's effort has grown to include the participation of a multitude of industry participants that engage their customers, employees, and the general public in awareness, as well as college campuses, non-profits and other groups.

In 2009, DHS Secretary Janet Napolitano launched the National Cybersecurity Alliance (NCA) and the U.S. Department of Homeland Security (DHS) Cybersecurity Awareness Month in Washington, D.C., becoming the highest-ranking government official to participate in the month's activities. Today, leading administration officials from DHS, the White House and other agencies regularly participate in NCA events across the United States.

References

501(c)(3) organizations
Computer security organizations
Consumer organizations in the United States